Veerapol Sahaprom or Veerapol Nakornloung (born November 16, 1968) is one of the best boxers from Thailand a former WBC and WBA Bantamweight Champion. He is from the Nakhon Ratchasima province in Thailand. He is nicknamed "Solemn-faced Tiger" or "Deathmask" because he never changes his expression when throwing punches.

He is well known for his precise jab.

Early life & Muay Thai
Sahaprom (nickname: Pol; พล) was born in Amphoe Mueang Nakhon Ratchasima, Nakhon Ratchasima province, but raised in Amphoe Kaeng Khoi, Saraburi province. He started boxing from Muay Thai since childhood from his brother forced. He made his Bangkok debut in 1985. Around 1990–94, he was a famous Muay Thai fighter under Chucharoen "Ung-mor" Raveearamwong stable. He has faced many fighters, such as Santos Devy, Sillapathai Jockygym, Langsuan Panyuthaphum, Dokmaipa Por Pongsawang, Duangsompong Por Pongsawang, Burklerk Pinsinchai, and ever lost-won with Saenmuangnoi Lukchaopormahesak (Samson Dutch Boy Gym) two times, his maximum salary was 220,000 baht in fight with Baeber Narupai. He won three different weight classes championships of the Rajadamnern Stadium. His last fight in Muay Thai was to fight with Saenklai Sit Kru Od at Lumpinee Stadium.

Boxing career 
Veerapol Sahaprom entered professional boxing in 1994 under Suchart Pisitwuttinan of Nakornluang Promotion as promoter and manager. In the debut, where he won the WBC International Super Flyweight Title. He challenged a world title for the first time in only his fourth fight as a professional, defeating fellow thai fighter Daorung Chuvatana. However, Sahaprom lost his first defense  against former WBC Super Flyweight Champion Nana Konadu at Kanchanaburi Stadium, losing his title in only four months.

Three years after losing his WBA world title, Sahaprom got his second world title shot against WBC Bantamweight Champion Joichiro Tatsuyoshi on December 29, 1998. The fight took place in Osaka, Japan, and Sahaprom won by Technical Knockout in the 6th round, becoming world champion for the second time. Sahaprom fought Tatsuyoshi again in August, 1999, knocking him out in the 7th round for his second defense of the title.

Sahaprom defended his title 14 times from 1996 to 2005, winning numerous non-title fights in between. He also fought Japanese boxer Toshiaki Nishioka four times during his reign, retaining his title in every single fight. Sahaprom finally lost his title to Hozumi Hasegawa in a 12-round unanimous decision. He held the WBC Bantamweight Title for over six years.

Sahaprom fought five non-title fights after losing his title to Hasegawa, winning all five, including four by knockout. He challenged Hasegawa on March 25, 2006 in Kobe to avenge his loss, but was knocked down with a right hook in the 9th round, and was unable to pick himself up. This was the second knockout loss of his career, and his eighth fight in Japan.

Retirement 
Sahaprom announced his retirement from boxing at age 39 after a loss to Vusi Malinga in a world title eliminator on June 12 in Bangkok, Thailand.  He returned to the ring less than a year later on March 20, 2009 to knockout Yudi Arema.

After  retirement, he opened a Thai food restaurant in Chaiyaphum province. He is also a trainer the Dabransarakarm gym in Maha Sarakham province.

Titles
Muay Thai
Rajadamnern Stadium
 1987 Rajadamnern Stadium Junior Flyweight (108 lbs) Champion
 1988 Rajadamnern Stadium Flyweight (112 lbs) Champion
 1993 Rajadamnern Stadium Junior Bantamweight (115 lbs) Champion
 1993 Rajadamnern Stadium Fighter of the Year

Boxing
World Boxing Council
 1994 WBC International Super Flyweight Champion (115 lbs)
 1998 WBC Bantamweight World Champion (118 lbs)
World Boxing Association
 1995 WBA Bantamweight World Champion (118 lbs)

Muay Thai record

|- style="background:#cfc;"
| 1994-09-23 ||Win ||align=left| Saenklai Sit Kru Od || Lumpinee Stadium ||  Bangkok, Thailand  || Decision || 5 || 3:00
|- style="background:#cfc;"
| 1994-08-11 ||Win ||align=left| Michael Chalermsri||  ||  Bangkok, Thailand  || KO|| 3 ||
|- style="background:#cfc;"
| 1994-06-22 ||Win ||align=left| Chatchainoi Chaoraiaoi || Rajadamnern Stadium ||  Bangkok, Thailand  || Decision || 5 || 3:00
|-
! style=background:white colspan=9 |
|-  style="background:#fbb;"
| 1994-05-19 ||Loss ||align=left| Burklerk Pinsinchai || Rajadamnern Stadium || Bangkok, Thailand || Decision || 5 || 3:00
|- style="background:#cfc;"
| 1994-04-07||Win ||align=left| Sukhothai Taximeter|| Rajadamnern Stadium ||  Bangkok, Thailand  || Decision || 5 || 3:00
|- style="background:#cfc;"
| 1994-02-17||Win ||align=left| Duangsompong Por.Pongsawang|| Rajadamnern Stadium ||  Bangkok, Thailand  || KO (Punches)|| 5 || 
|-
! style=background:white colspan=9 |
|- style="background:#cfc;"
| 1994-01-06 ||Win ||align=left| Dokmaipa Por Pongsawang || Rajadamnern Stadium ||  Bangkok, Thailand  || Decision || 5 || 3:00
|- style="background:#cfc;"
| 1993-12-13 || Win ||align=left| Burklerk Pinsinchai || Rajadamnern Stadium  ||  Bangkok, Thailand  || KO (Punches)|| 2 ||
|- style="background:#cfc;"
| 1993-10-14 || Win ||align=left| Jaroensak Or Nunangjumnong || Rajadamnern Stadium  ||  Bangkok, Thailand  || Decision || 5 || 3:00
|- style="background:#cfc;"
| 1993-09-16 || Win ||align=left| Langsuan Panyuthaphum || Lumpinee Stadium  ||  Bangkok, Thailand  || KO (Left Hook)|| 3 ||
|- style="background:#fbb;"
| 1993-07-28 ||Loss ||align=left| Silapathai Jockygym || Rajadamnern Stadium  ||  Bangkok, Thailand  || Decision || 5 || 3:00
|- style="background:#cfc;"
| 1993-06-23 ||Win ||align=left| Silapathai Jockygym || Rajadamnern Stadium  ||  Bangkok, Thailand  || KO (Left Hook) || 5 || 
|-
! style=background:white colspan=9 |
|-  style="background:#fbb;"
| 1993-05-28 ||Loss ||align=left| Singdam Or.Ukrit || Lumpinee Stadium || Bangkok, Thailand || Decision || 5 || 3:00
|-  style="background:#cfc;"
| 1993-05-11 ||Win ||align=left| Saenmuangnoi Lukchaopormahesak || Lumpinee Stadium || Bangkok, Thailand || TKO (Right Cross) || 2 ||
|- style="background:#cfc;"
| 1993-04-02 ||Win ||align=left| Chatchainoi Chaoraiaoi || Lumpinee Stadium ||  Bangkok, Thailand  || Decision || 5 || 3:00
|-  style="background:#fbb;"
| 1993-03-08 ||Loss ||align=left| Burklerk Pinsinchai || Rajadamnern Stadium || Bangkok, Thailand || Decision || 5 || 3:00
|- style="background:#cfc;"
| 1993-02-19 ||Win ||align=left| Kiewmorakot Prainan || Lumpinee Stadium ||  Bangkok, Thailand  || KO (Low kick & Punches)|| 2 ||
|-  style="background:#fbb;"
| 1993-01-31 ||Loss ||align=left| Saenklai Sit Kru Od || Rajadamnern Stadium || Bangkok, Thailand || Decision || 5 || 3:00
|-  style="background:#fbb;"
| 1992-12-25 ||Loss ||align=left| Saenklai Sit Kru Od || Lumpinee Stadium || Bangkok, Thailand || Decision || 5 || 3:00
|- style="background:#fbb;"
| 1992-11-26 ||Loss ||align=left| Dejrit Sor.Ploenchit || ||  Bangkok, Thailand  || KO || 3 ||
|- style="background:#cfc;"
| 1992-10-28 ||Win||align=left| Chatpichit Naphapol || ||  Bangkok, Thailand  || KO || 3 ||
|- style="background:#fbb;"
| 1992-09-24 ||Loss ||align=left| Saenkeng Pinsinchai || ||  Bangkok, Thailand  || Decision || 5 || 3:00
|- style="background:#cfc;"
| 1992-05-27 ||Win ||align=left| Nungubon Sitlerchai || Lumpinee Stadium ||  Bangkok, Thailand  || Decision || 5 || 3:00
|- style="background:#cfc;"
| 1992-05-05 ||Win ||align=left| Dokmaipa Por Pongsawang || Lumpinee Stadium ||  Bangkok, Thailand  || Decision || 5 || 3:00
|- style="background:#cfc;"
| 1992-03-18 ||Win ||align=left| Nopadet Sor.Rewadee || Rajadamnern Stadium ||  Bangkok, Thailand  || KO (Right hook)|| 3 ||
|- style="background:#cfc;"
| 1992-02-20 || Win||align=left| Wanwiset Kaennorasing || ||  Bangkok, Thailand  || KO  || 4 ||
|- style="background:#fbb;"
| 1992-01-15 || Loss ||align=left| Nopadet Sor.Rewadee || Rajadamnern Stadium ||  Bangkok, Thailand  || Decision || 5 || 3:00
|- style="background:#cfc;"
| 1991-11-29 ||Win ||align=left| Duangsompomg Por.Pongsawang || Lumpinee Stadium ||  Bangkok, Thailand  ||  Decision || 5 || 3:00
|-  style="background:#fbb;"
| 1991-10-30 ||Loss ||align=left| Saenmuangnoi Lukchaopormahesak || Rajadamnern Stadium || Bangkok, Thailand || KO (Left Cross) || 2 ||
|- style="background:#fbb;"
| 1991-09-19 || Loss ||align=left| Burklerk Pinsinchai || Rajadamnern Stadium ||  Bangkok, Thailand  || Decision || 5 || 3:00
|- style="background:#cfc;"
| 1991-08-23 ||Win ||align=left| Saenklai Sit Kru Od || Lumpinee Stadium ||  Bangkok, Thailand  ||  Decision || 5 || 3:00
|- style="background:#cfc;"
| 1991-06-24 ||Win ||align=left| Karuhat Sor.Supawan || Rajadamnern Stadium ||  Bangkok, Thailand  || Decision || 5 || 3:00
|- style="background:#cfc;"
| 1991-05-08 ||Win ||align=left| Dennuah Denmolee || Rajadamnern Stadium ||  Bangkok, Thailand  || KO (Right Cross)|| 3 ||
|- style="background:#fbb"
| 1991-03-21 || Loss||align=left| Panomrung Sit Sor Wor Por || Rajadamnern Stadium ||  Bangkok, Thailand  || Decision || 5 || 3:00
|- style="background:#cfc;"
| 1991-01-17 ||Win ||align=left| Ekaphol Chuwattana || Rajadamnern Stadium ||  Bangkok, Thailand  || Decision || 5 || 3:00
|- style="background:#cfc;"
| 1990-12-10 ||Win ||align=left| Nopadet Sor.Rewadee || Rajadamnern Stadium ||  Bangkok, Thailand  || Decision || 5 || 3:00
|- style="background:#fbb"
| 1990-11-14 || Loss||align=left| Boonam Chor Waikul || Rajadamnern Stadium ||  Bangkok, Thailand  || Decision || 5 || 3:00
|- style="background:#c5d2ea"
| 1990-10-22 || Draw||align=left| Kaensak Sor.Ploenjit || Rajadamnern Stadium ||  Bangkok, Thailand  || Decision || 5 || 3:00
|- style="background:#cfc;"
| 1990-09-27 ||Win ||align=left| Nopadet Sor.Rewadee || Rajadamnern Stadium ||  Bangkok, Thailand  || Decision || 5 || 3:00
|- style="background:#cfc;"
| 1990-08-30 ||Win ||align=left| Nopadet Sor.Rewadee || Rajadamnern Stadium ||  Bangkok, Thailand  || Decision || 5 || 3:00
|- style="background:#cfc;"
| 1990-08-06 ||Win ||align=left| Ratchapracha Na Pattaya || Rajadamnern Stadium ||  Bangkok, Thailand  || Decision || 5 || 3:00
|- style="background:#cfc;"
| 1990-07-19 ||Win ||align=left| Thanongdej Kiatpayathai || Rajadamnern Stadium ||  Bangkok, Thailand  || KO (Punches)||  ||
|- style="background:#fbb;"
| 1990-06-24 ||Loss ||align=left| Dejrit Sor.Ploenchit || Rajadamnern Stadium ||  Bangkok, Thailand  || Decision || 5 || 3:00
|- style="background:#cfc;"
| 1990-05-31 ||Win ||align=left| Chain Pisinchai || Rajadamnern Stadium ||  Bangkok, Thailand  || KO || 3 ||
|- style="background:#cfc;"
| 1990-04-26 ||Win ||align=left| Deenung Phattanakit ||  ||  Bangkok, Thailand  || Decision || 5 || 3:00
|- style="background:#fbb;"
| 1990-03-22 ||Loss ||align=left| Dejrit Sor.Ploenchit || Rajadamnern Stadium ||  Bangkok, Thailand  || Decision || 5 || 3:00
|- style="background:#fbb;"
| 1990-02-15 ||Loss ||align=left| Suwitlek Lookbangplasoi|| Rajadamnern Stadium ||  Bangkok, Thailand  || Decision || 5 || 3:00
|- style="background:#fbb;"
| 1990-01-11 ||Loss ||align=left| Suntos Devy || Rajadamnern Stadium ||  Bangkok, Thailand  || Decision || 5 || 3:00
|- style="background:#cfc;"
| 1989-12-14 ||Win ||align=left| Colalek Sor.Thanikul ||  Rajadamnern Stadium  || Bangkok, Thailand || KO || 3 ||
|- style="background:#fbb;"
| 1989-10-06 || Loss||align=left| Karuhat Sor.Supawan ||  Lumpinee Stadium  || Bangkok, Thailand || Decision || 5 ||3:00
|- style="background:#cfc;"
| 1989-09-05 ||Win ||align=left| Toto Por Pongsawang ||  Lumpinee Stadium  || Bangkok, Thailand || KO || 2 ||
|- style="background:#cfc;"
| 1989-08-24 ||Win ||align=left| Odnoi Lukprabath ||  Rajadamnern Stadium  || Bangkok, Thailand || Decision || 5 || 3:00
|- style="background:#fbb;"
| 1989-06-13 ||Loss ||align=left| Toto Por Pongsawang || Lumpinee Stadium ||  Bangkok, Thailand  || TKO (leg injury)||  ||
|- style="background:#c5d2ea"
| 1989-05-12 || Draw||align=left| Phanphet Muangsurin || Lumpinee Stadium ||  Bangkok, Thailand  || Decision || 5 || 3:00
|- style="background:#cfc;"
| 1989-04-20 ||Win ||align=left| Hippy Singmanee ||  Rajadamnern Stadium  || Bangkok, Thailand || Decision || 5 || 3:00
|- style="background:#fbb;"
| 1989-01-15 ||Loss ||align=left| Dennuah Denmolee || Crocodile Farm  ||  Samut Prakan, Thailand  || Decision || 5 || 3:00 
|-
! style=background:white colspan=9 |
|- style="background:#fbb;"
| 1988-11-25 || Loss ||align=left| Karuhat Sor.Supawan || Lumpinee Stadium ||  Bangkok, Thailand  || Decision || 5 || 3:00
|- style="background:#fbb;"
| 1988-11-04 ||Loss ||align=left| Hippy Singmanee ||  Lumpinee Stadium  || Bangkok, Thailand || Decision || 5 || 3:00
|- style="background:#fbb;"
| 1988-10-13 || Loss ||align=left| Langsuan Panyuthaphum || Rajadamnern Stadium  ||  Bangkok, Thailand  || Decision || 5 || 3:00
|- style="background:#cfc;"
| 1988-07-26 ||Win ||align=left| Paruhatlek Sitchunthong || Lumpinee Stadium  ||  Bangkok, Thailand  || Decision || 5 || 3:00
|- style="background:#cfc;"
| 1988-04-15 ||Win ||align=left| Hippy Singmanee || Ramkomut Pattani Boxing Stadium  ||  Pattani Province, Thailand  || Decision || 5 || 3:00
|- style="background:#cfc;"
| 1988-03-24 ||Win ||align=left| Samernoi Tor.Boonlert || Rajadamnern Stadium  ||  Bangkok, Thailand  || Decision || 5 || 3:00 
|-
! style=background:white colspan=9 |

|- style="background:#cfc;"
| 1987-12-31 ||Win||align=left| Sakchai Wongwianyai || Rajadamnern Stadium  ||  Bangkok, Thailand  || Decision|| 5 ||3:00

|- style="background:#cfc;"
| 1987-10-12 ||Win ||align=left| Pewphong Sitbobai || Rajadamnern Stadium  ||  Bangkok, Thailand  || Decision || 5 || 3:00 
|-
! style=background:white colspan=9 |

|- style="background:#cfc;"
| 1987-08-18 ||Win ||align=left| Kwanjai Petchyindee || Lumpinee Stadium  ||  Bangkok, Thailand  ||Decision|| 5 ||3:00
|- style="background:#cfc;"
| 1987-06-24 ||Win ||align=left|  Daotrang Tor.Boonlert || Rajadamnern Stadium  ||  Bangkok, Thailand  || Decision|| 5 ||3:00
|- style="background:#fbb;"
| 1987-05-12 ||Loss||align=left| Sakchai Wongwianyai || Lumpinee Stadium  ||  Bangkok, Thailand  || Decision|| 5 ||3:00
|- style="background:#cfc;"
| 1987-04-09 ||Win ||align=left| Eddie Sitwatsiripong || Rajadamnern Stadium  ||  Bangkok, Thailand  || Decision|| 5 ||3:00
|- style="background:#cfc;"
| 1987-03-02 ||Win ||align=left| Makan Sor.Ploenchit || Rajadamnern Stadium  ||  Bangkok, Thailand  || Decision|| 5 ||3:00
|- style="background:#cfc;"
| 1987-02-05 ||Win ||align=left| Luksing Chuwattana || Rajadamnern Stadium  ||  Bangkok, Thailand  || KO || 5 ||
|- style="background:#fbb;"
| 1987-01-05 ||Loss ||align=left| Chutchong Por.Worawut || Rajadamnern Stadium  ||  Bangkok, Thailand  || ||  ||

|- style="background:#cfc;"
| 1982-1983 ||Win ||align=left| Singyoen Singisel || ||  Thailand  || KO (Punches)|| 4 || 
|-
! style=background:white colspan=9 |
|-
| colspan=9 | Legend:

Professional boxing record

See also 
 List of WBC world champions

References

External links 
 

1968 births
Bantamweight boxers
Living people
World Boxing Association champions
World Boxing Council champions
World bantamweight boxing champions
World boxing champions
Veeraphol Sahaprom
Veeraphol Sahaprom
Veeraphol Sahaprom
Veeraphol Sahaprom
Muay Thai trainers